Michael Aaron Fishman (born October 22, 1981) is an American actor, writer, and producer known for playing D.J. Conner on the long-running series Roseanne and its spin-off show, The Conners.

Early life
Fishman was born in Los Angeles County, California, to a family of Jewish descent.

He grew up in Cypress, California in Orange county and attended Arnold Elementary School.

Career

Roseanne: 1988–1997, 2018
Fishman's acting career began after he met Roseanne Barr during an early audition.  She asked him to tell her a joke.  He said, "Why did the turtle cross the road? it was the chicken's day off."  She was impressed, and although he had no experience, Barr fought for Fishman to play D.J. Conner. He worked on Roseanne from age six to fifteen.

On April 28, 2017, it was announced that an eight-episode revival of Roseanne was in the works and being shopped around to various networks and that it would feature most of the original main cast. However, at the time, it was unknown if Fishman would reprise his role as D.J. Conner.<ref>{{Cite news |url= http://www.nydailynews.com/entertainment/tv/roseanne-revival-works-article-1.3113625 |title= Roseanne' TV show revival in the works with main cast set to reprise roles |work=New York Daily News |access-date=2017-04-28}}</ref> On May 16, 2017, it was confirmed that Fishman had signed on to appear in the revival, to air mid-season in 2018 on ABC.

1997–2017
Fishman continued to act while attending the Orange County High School of the Arts at Los Alamitos High School in the Musical Theater and Technical Theater departments.

He appeared in guest roles on Walker, Texas Ranger and Seinfeld, and earned a recurring role alongside Andrew Dice Clay on Hitz just before it was canceled. Fishman also appeared in films, including Steven Spielberg's A.I. Artificial Intelligence. He then reconnected with Barr as a co-host of The Roseanne Show, which ran for two years before it was canceled in 2000.

Fishman has also worked on many television shows and films in other roles aside from acting, including executive producing, writing, directing, set building, production staff and camera operating. Some of his credits include, Great Job, Thanks!, The Real Roseanne Show & Sport Science.

In 2013, he was cast in Joseph Mazzello's directorial debut sports comedy-drama film Undrafted as Antonelli. The film was released on July 15, 2016.

The Conners: 2018–2022

On June 21, 2018, ABC announced a spin-off from Roseanne, titled The Conners, with all the original cast (excluding Barr) to return; the show premiered on October 16, 2018. On March 22, 2019, ABC announced that the show had been renewed for a second season. Fishman was not listed as part of the returning main cast, but the network press release said that additional cast to be announced at a later date.

On October 5, 2020, Fishman announced he would be directing the seventh episode of the show's third season. Although it is the seventh episode to be filmed, it will air in the second week of the show, as the Halloween special.

Fishman was told he would not return for season 5 of The Conners.

Personal life
Fishman and Jennifer Briner married on October 22, 1999. They were separated as of June 16, 2017, according to a formal application for legal separation Briner filed on December 27, 2018. On April 22, 2019, Briner officially filed for divorce. The couple have two children, son Aaron & daughter Isabelle.Fishman in 

Filmography
Film

Television

Awards and nominations
Emmy Award
 2007: Nominated, "Outstanding Production Design / Art Direction" – Sports ScienceTV Land Award
 2008: Won, "Innovator Award" – RoseanneYoung Artist Award
 1989: Nominated, "Best Young Actor Under Nine Years of Age" – Roseanne 1991: Nominated, "Best Young Actor Under Nine Years of Age" – Roseanne 1995: Won, "Best Performance: Young Actor in a TV Comedy Series" – RoseanneYoungStar Awards
 1997: Nominated, "Best Performance by a Young Actor in a Comedy TV Series" – Roseanne''

References

External links
 

1981 births
American male child actors
American male film actors
American male television actors
Living people
Male actors from Long Beach, California
Orange County School of the Arts alumni
Jewish American actors